Michael Carr-Hartley (born 3 February 1942) is a Kenyan former sports shooter. He competed at the 1972 Summer Olympics and the 1984 Summer Olympics.

References

1942 births
Living people
Kenyan male sport shooters
Olympic shooters of Kenya
Shooters at the 1972 Summer Olympics
Shooters at the 1984 Summer Olympics
Place of birth missing (living people)